Abhishek Sakuja (born 28 May 1987) is an Indian first-class cricketer who has played for the Services cricket team in the Ranji Trophy. He has represented the Services cricket team in the Vijay Hazare Trophy  and the Syed Mushtaq Ali Trophy. He has also represented the North Zone team in the Deodhar Trophy in 2013/14 season. He also plays in the Karnataka Premier League, where he represents the Hubli Tigers team. He was the highest wicket taker in the 2017 edition of the Karnataka Premier League

References 

Living people
Services cricketers
1987 births
Indian cricketers
Cricketers from Delhi
North Zone cricketers